Myra Ndjoku Manianga is the Minister of the Interior of the Democratic Republic of the Congo. He studied at the University of Nanterre in France. He was Secretary General of the State Security Committee. He is from Kasai-Occidental. He became minister in 2001.

Sources
https://web.archive.org/web/20041024131429/http://www.un.int/drcongo/disc14/0000001b.htm

Year of birth missing (living people)
Living people
Government ministers of the Democratic Republic of the Congo
Place of birth missing (living people)
Paris Nanterre University alumni
21st-century Democratic Republic of the Congo politicians
Ambassadors of the Democratic Republic of the Congo to France